Nuevo León Institute of Technology, or ITNL  is an institution of higher education in Guadalupe, Nuevo Léon, México. This school was founded in 1976 in Apodaca, but later was moved to Monterrey and finally to Guadalupe.

The ITNL offers 4 bachelor's degrees and 1 master's degree in mechatronic.

References

Technical universities and colleges in Mexico
Public universities and colleges in Mexico
Universities and colleges in Nuevo León
Educational institutions established in 1976
1976 establishments in Mexico